Gelechia exclarella is a moth of the family Gelechiidae. It is found in Puerto Rico.

References

Moths described in 1890
Gelechia